Kern County is a county located in the U.S. state of California. As of the 2020 census, the population was 909,235. Its county seat is Bakersfield.

Kern County comprises the Bakersfield, California, Metropolitan statistical area. The county spans the southern end of the Central Valley. Covering , it ranges west to the southern slope of the Coast Ranges, and east beyond the southern slope of the eastern Sierra Nevada into the Mojave Desert, at the city of Ridgecrest. Its northernmost city is Delano, and its southern reach extends to just beyond Frazier Park, and the northern extremity of the parallel Antelope Valley.

The county's economy is heavily linked to agriculture and to petroleum extraction. There is also a strong aviation, space, and military presence, such as Edwards Air Force Base, the China Lake Naval Air Weapons Station, and the Mojave Air and Space Port.

With a population that is 54.9% Hispanic as of 2020, Kern is California's third-most populous majority-Hispanic county and the sixth-largest nationwide.

History

Indigenous Era
Native Americans lived in this region for hundreds of years: Chumash, tribes grouped together under the settler name Yokuts, and others.

Spanish era
Spain claimed the area in 1769. Entering from Grapevine Canyon to the south in 1772, Commander Don Pedro Fages became the first European to set foot in the area.

The Battle of San Emigdio took place in Kern County in March 1824. The Chumash Native Americans of Mission Santa Barbara rebelled against the Mexican government and its taking over mission property and ejecting the natives. The battle occurred in the canyon where San Emigdio Creek flows down San Emigdio Mountain and the Blue Ridge, south of Bakersfield near today's Highway 166.  Mexican forces from Monterey were commanded by Carlos Carrillo and the conflict was a low-casualty encounter, with only four Native Americans being killed and no Mexicans. The surviving Native Americans were pacified and brought back to Santa Barbara in June 1824 after a pursuit and negotiation in which many were allowed to keep their arms for the return march over the mountains.

American era

In the beginning, what was to become Kern County was dominated by mining in the mountains and in the desert. In 1855 the California legislature attempted to form a county in the area by giving the southeastern territory of Tulare County on the west of the Sierra Nevada Mountains to Buena Vista County. However, it was never officially organized prior to 1859, when the enabling legislation expired. The south of Tulare County was later organized as Kern County in 1866, with additions from Los Angeles and San Bernardino Counties. Its first county seat was the mining town of Havilah, in the mountains east of Bakersfield and north of Tehachapi.

Settlers considered the flat land of the valley inhospitable and impassable at the time due to swamps, lakes, tule reeds and diseases such as malaria. This changed when residents started draining land for farming and constructing canals, most dug by hired Chinese laborers. Within 10 years the valley surpassed the mining areas as the economic power of the county, and as a result the county seat was moved from Havilah to Bakersfield in 1874.

In 1899, the discovery well of the Kern River Oil Field was dug by hand and soon the towns of Oil City, Oil Center and Oildale came into existence.

Etymology
The county derives its name from the Kern River, which was named for Edward Kern, cartographer for General John C. Frémont's 1845 expedition, which crossed Walker Pass. The Kern River was originally named Rio Bravo de San Felipe by Father Francisco Garcés when he explored the area in 1776.

Earthquakes

Throughout recorded history, severe earthquakes have struck Kern County, including the 1857 Fort Tejon earthquake.

It measured 7.3 on the moment magnitude scale and killed 12 people. In addition to the deaths, it was responsible for hundreds of injuries and more than $60 million in property damage. The main shock was felt over much of California and as far away as Phoenix, Arizona and Reno, Nevada. The earthquake occurred on the White Wolf Fault and was the strongest to occur in California since the 1906 San Francisco earthquake. Tehachapi suffered the greatest damage and loss of life from the earthquake, though its effects were widely felt throughout central and southern California. The event had a significant aftershock sequence that persisted into July and August with the strongest coming on August 22, an M5.8 event with a maximum perceived intensity of VIII (Severe) and resulted in two additional deaths and an additional $10 million in property damage. Repercussions of the sequence of earthquakes were still being felt in the heavily damaged downtown area of Bakersfield well into the 1990s as city leaders attempted to improve safety of the surviving non-reinforced masonry buildings.

Following the event, a field survey was conducted along the fault zone with the goal of estimating the peak ground acceleration of the shock based on visually evaluating rock formations and other indicators. Ground disturbances that were created by the earthquakes were also surveyed, both in the valley and in the foothills, with both vertical and horizontal displacements present in the epicenter area. The motion records that were acquired from the event were significant, and a reconnaissance report was recognized for its coverage of the event, and its setting a standard for similar engineering or scientific papers.

Abuse trials
Between 1983 and 1986, several ritual sex ring child abuse cases occurred in Kern County, resulting in numerous long prison sentences, all of which were overturned—some of them decades later, because the prosecutors had coerced false testimonies from the purported child victims. The details of these false accusations are covered extensively in the 2008 documentary Witch Hunt, narrated by Sean Penn.

Geography

It is the third-largest county by area in California. The tallest peak in the county is Sawmill Mountain with an elevation of 8822 ft. Its area is nearly the size of the state of New Hampshire; it extends:

 East beyond the southern slope of the Sierra Nevada range into the Mojave Desert, and includes parts of the Indian Wells Valley and Antelope Valley.
 West from the Sierra across the floor of the San Joaquin Valley to the eastern edge of the Temblor Range, part of the Coast Ranges.
 South over the ridge of the Tehachapi Mountains.

Air quality 

Kern County suffers from severe air pollution. Particulates cause poor visibility, especially in the winter. Western Kern County lies in the San Joaquin Valley and the topography traps pollutants. Although the topography is not as unfavorable in eastern Kern County, eastern Kern County is a non-attainment area for particulates. Air pollution caused by particulates is "in the unhealthy range an average of 40 days a year, according to the American Lung Association's (ALA) 2018 State of the Air Report.

Vegetation
Chaparral comprises a considerable portion of the natural area within Kern County; the species diversity within these chaparral habitats, however, is considerably less than in many other regions of California. Whitethorn is a prominent example of chaparral species on the rocky slopes of the Sierra Nevada as well as the Inner Coastal Ranges. California Buckeye is a notable tree found in both chaparral and forests and whose southern range terminates in Kern County.

National protected areas

 Bitter Creek National Wildlife Refuge
 Carrizo Plain National Monument (part)
 César E. Chávez National Monument
 Giant Sequoia National Monument (part)
 Kern National Wildlife Refuge
 Los Padres National Forest (part)
 Sequoia National Forest (part)

Demographics

According to the 2020 United States Census, Kern County's population was 909,235. It was the eleventh-largest county by population in California. The center of population of California is located in Kern County, in the town of Buttonwillow .

2020 census

Note: the US Census treats Hispanic/Latino as an ethnic category. This table excludes Latinos from the racial categories and assigns them to a separate category. Hispanics/Latinos can be of any race.

According to the 2020 United States Census:

Hispanic (54.9%)
White Non-Hispanic (30.8%)
Black (5.5%)
Asian (5.1%)
Two or more races (16.1%)
Indigenous (2.0%)
Some other race (30.2%)
(Total can be greater than 100% because Hispanics may be counted in any race.)

2011

Places by population, race, and income

2010
The 2010 United States Census reported that Kern County had a population of 839,631. The racial makeup of Kern County was 499,766 (59.5%) White, 48,921 (5.8%) African American, 12,676 (1.5%) Native American, 34,846 (4.2%) Asian, 1,252 (0.1%) Pacific Islander, 204,314 (24.3%) from other races, and 37,856 (4.5%) from two or more races. Hispanic or Latino of any race were 413,033 persons (49.2%); 43.4% of Kern County residents are of Mexican heritage, 1.0% Salvadoran, 0.5% Colombian, and 0.4% Guatemalan.

2000
According to the 2000 United States Census of 2000, there were 661,645 people, 208,652 households, and 156,489 families residing in the county. The population density was 81 people per square mile (31/km2). There were 231,564 housing units at an average density of 28 per square mile (11/km2). The racial makeup of the county was 61.6% White, 6.0% Black or African American, 3.4% Asian, 1.5% Native American, 0.2% Pacific Islander, 23.2% from other races, and 4.1% from two or more races. 38.4% of the population were Hispanic or Latino of any race. 8.4% were of German, 7.2% American and 5.7% Irish ancestry, according to the census. 66.8% spoke English, 29.1% Spanish and 1.0% Tagalog as their first language.

There were 208,652 households, out of which 42.2% had children under the age of 18 living with them, 54.6% were married couples living together, 14.5% had a female householder with no husband present, and 25.0% were non-families. 20.3% of all households were made up of individuals, and 7.8% had someone living alone who was 65 years of age or older. The average household size was 3.03 and the average family size was 3.50.

In the county, the age distribution of the population shows 31.9% under the age of 18, 10.2% from 18 to 24, 29.8% from 25 to 44, 18.7% from 45 to 64, and 9.4% who were 65 years of age or older. The median age was 31 years. For every 100 females there were 105.3 males. For every 100 females age 18 and over, there were 105.3 males.

The median income for a household in the county was $35,446, and the median income for a family was $39,403. Males had a median income of $38,097 versus $25,876 for females. The per capita income for the county was $15,760. About 16.8% of families and 20.8% of the population were below the poverty line, including 27.8% of those under age 18 and 10.5% of those age 65 or over.

Arts and culture

Kern County is associated with the Bakersfield sound. The Buck Owens Crystal Palace is located in Bakersfield.

Metropolitan statistical area
The United States Office of Management and Budget has designated Kern County as the Bakersfield, CA Metropolitan Statistical Area. The United States Census Bureau ranked the Bakersfield, CA Metropolitan Statistical Area as the 63rd most populous metropolitan statistical area and the 68th most populous primary statistical area of the United States as of July 1, 2012.

Government, policing, and politics

Government
Kern County is a California Constitution-defined general law county and is governed by an elected Board of Supervisors. The Board consists of five members, elected by districts, who serve four-year staggered terms. The county government provides countywide services such as elections and voter registration, some law enforcement, jails, vital records, property records, tax collection, public health, and social services. In addition, the County serves as the local government for all unincorporated areas.

Policing

Sheriff
The Kern County Sheriff provides court protection, jail administration, and coroner services for the entire county of approximately 900,000 in population. It provides patrol and detective services for the unincorporated areas of the county and by contract to certain municipalities. The main Sheriff's office and station is at Bakersfield. There are 15 sheriff substations for the widespread county.

Municipal police
Municipal police departments in the county are: Bakersfield, population 384,000; Delano, 54,000; Ridgecrest, 29,000; Wasco (sheriff contract city), 28,000; Arvin, 21,000; Shafter, 20,000;  McFarland, 15,000; California City, 14,671; Tehachapi, 13,000; Taft, 9,327; Maricopa (sheriff contract city), 1,200.

Politics and voter registration

Cities by population and voter registration

Federal
Kern is a strongly Republican county in Presidential and congressional elections. The last Democratic candidate for President to win a majority in the county was Lyndon Johnson in 1964. Kern remains the only county in Southern California that consistently votes Republican in recent elections. However, Republican margins in the county have shrunk recently, with Donald Trump's 10.2% margin of victory in 2020 being the smallest since Gerald Ford's 6.7% majority in 1976.

State

In the State Assembly, Kern County is split between the following four Assembly districts:
 
 
 , and
 .

On November 4, 2008, Kern County voted 75.29% in favor of Proposition 8, which amended the California Constitution to ban same-sex marriages.

County
Kern County is governed by a five-member Board of Supervisors. Jeff Flores of District 3 currently serves as chairman. As of 2023, they are:

 District 1, Philip Peters.
 District 2, Zack Scrivner.
 District 3, Jeff Flores.
 District 4, David Couch.
 District 5, Leticia Perez.

Crime and public safety 

Fire protection within the county is provided by the Kern County Fire Department. Law enforcement within the county is provided by the Kern County Sheriff's Department.

Fire

The Kern County Fire Department (KCFD) is an agency that provides fire protection and emergency medical services for the county of Kern, California, USA. KCFD provides fire protection services for over 500,000 citizens living in the unincorporated areas of Kern County and the cities of Arvin, Delano, Maricopa, McFarland, Ridgecrest, Shafter, Taft, Tehachapi and Wasco. This agency is contracted to provide dispatch services for the California City Fire Department, Kern Ambulance based in Wasco, and Liberty Ambulance of Bakersfield. Over 546 uniformed firefighters are stationed in 46 fire stations throughout the county.

Sheriff's Office

The Kern County Sheriff's Department is the agency responsible for law enforcement within the county of Kern. The department provides law enforcement within the county, maintains the jails used by both the county and municipal cities, and provides search and rescue. The department contains over 1,200 sworn deputies and civilian employees. The department headquarters is located at 1350 Norris Road in Bakersfield. There are 15 additional substations located throughout the county. The metro patrol area is divided into four regions: north, south, east, and west.

In 2009, the district attorney claimed "the highest per capita prison commitment rate of any major California county." Kern County contains multiple state and federal prisons, including two private prisons. As a result, the courts have been known to sentence a higher than average number of defendants to long prison sentences to help the local economy. The county is among the most prolific with the death penalty, assigning death penalty sentences in 26 cases since 1976. In 2015 Kern County policemen from all departments killed more people per capita than any other American county. Because of the very harsh local criminal justice system, Kern County has been dubbed "the most punitive authoritarian jurisdiction on the west coast" and "Oklahoma of the west". In 2015, it was revealed that the Kern County Sheriff's office engaged in a longstanding program of attempted cash payoffs to women who had accused deputies of sexual assault. In the same year, a civil lawsuit filed by a survivor of a sexual assault committed by Kern County Sheriff's deputy Gabriel Lopez was settled for $1 million.

Kern County had the most deaths per capita in the US by police shooting per an article published in The Guardian on December 1, 2015. In 2015 to the date of publication of the article, there have been 13 deaths by police shootings in a county of less than 875,000 population, or 0.016 per thousand persons. By comparison, during the same period of time in New York City, a population 10 times the size with a police force more than 20 times the size, there were 9 such deaths.

The following table includes the number of incidents reported and the rate per 1,000 persons for each type of offense.

Cities by population and crime rates

Economy

The county has a large agricultural base and is a significant producer of oil, natural gas, hydro-electric power, Biomass, solar power, and wind power. Kern is noted for minerals, including gold, borate, and kernite. The largest open pit mine in California, which mines borax, is at Boron. As of October 1, 2016, Kern County contains nearly 25% of California's in-state renewable energy production, including 1,785 MW of solar power and 3,310 MW of wind power.  Kern County is home to the Tehachapi Energy Storage Project, which was commissioned in 2014.

Aerospace and military
Department of Defense facilities include Edwards Air Force Base and China Lake Naval Air Weapons Station. As home to Edwards Air Force Base the Air Force's main flight test facility, Kern has been the site of many milestones, including the first supersonic flight and the first landing of the Space Shuttle. The base has brought prosperity to the railroad towns of Mojave and Rosamond. Kern County is also the home of the first inland spaceport in the United States, the Mojave Spaceport.

Agriculture
This has long been one of the county's biggest industries. Between 2012 and 2013 the produced value of ag products increased 6%, to a total of $6.8 billion. Grape is 31%, almond is 17%, milk is 13%, citrus is 11%, cattle + calves and pistachio are both 7%, carrots are only 6% (but that's 80% of carrots for the entire United States), hay is 4%, and cotton and potatoes are both 2%, of that. This is one of the highest-producing locations in the United States for vegetables, and also for watermelons. Vegetables are estimated to total $320 million every year.

Major producer of almonds with production greater than  annually. That is third of all the counties, 16% of the state's production. (See also almond in California.)

Pistachio is another important employer here. The Michailides & Avenot group finds severe boscalid resistance in isolates of Alternaria alternata pathogenic on pistachio here. They find extensive such resistance in a swathe from the center down into the central southern part of the state, but especially here. (See also Pistachio in California and boscalid in California.)

The Glassy-Winged Sharpshooter (Homalodisca vitripennis) is a major insect pest in this county, including in this county's citrus groves. (See also Glassy-Winged Sharpshooter in California.)

Petroleum
, Kern is California's top oil-producing county, with 78% of the state's 56,653 active oil wells and 71% of oil production. The county produced 144.5 million barrels of oil in 2015, accounting for about 4% of overall U.S. oil production.

Discovery and development
Oil development began with the 1894 discovery of the Midway-Sunset Oil Field, now the third-largest in the United States, in the southwestern portion of Kern County near Maricopa. The 1899 discovery along the Kern River was a breakthrough in oil production. Oil was refined here even before the establishment of the county. The Buena Vista Petroleum Company was organized and incorporated in 1864. Soon thereafter a refinery was built that operated until April 1867 when work ceased because of high freight charges.

The 1910 Lakeview Gusher was the largest recorded oil strike in U.S. history. The well spewed approximately nine million barrels for 18 months before workers finally were able to cap it.

Other big oil fields in southwestern Kern County discovered early in the 20th century include the Buena Vista, the South Belridge and the Cymric fields. The latter is the fastest-growing field in California in terms of barrels produced per year. Later large fields include the Kern River Oil Field, the fifth-largest in the U.S., the adjacent Kern Front Oil Field, the Mount Poso Oil Field in the lower foothills of the Sierra north-northeast of Bakersfield and the Fruitvale Oil Field, which underlies much of the city of Bakersfield, along and north of the Kern River.

On July 22, 2009, Occidental Petroleum announced it had discovered the equivalent of 150 million to 250 million barrels of oil in Kern County, which the company called the largest oil discovery in California in 35 years. The find added about 10 percent to California's known reserves. Occidental's Ray Irani said it is likely that more oil would be found in the areas outside the initial six wells that tapped the discovery. Occidental has not revealed the exact location of the find, two-thirds of which is natural gas. BNET, an industry web publication, said the find would add to the company's 708 million barrels of proven reserves in California.

Petroleum today
The county today contributes more than three-quarters of all the oil produced onshore in California. Some of the large oil fields in Kern County which are still active include:

Buena Vista Oil Field
Cymric Oil Field
Edison Oil Field
Elk Hills Oil Field
Fruitvale Oil Field
Kern Front Oil Field
Kern River Oil Field
Lost Hills Oil Field
McKittrick Oil Field
Midway-Sunset Oil Field
Mountain View Oil Field
Mount Poso Oil Field
North Belridge Oil Field
Round Mountain Oil Field
South Belridge Oil Field

Transportation

Major highways

 Interstate 5
 U.S. Route 395
 State Route 14
 State Route 33
 State Route 41
 State Route 43
 State Route 46
 State Route 58
 State Route 65
 State Route 99
 State Route 119
 State Route 155
 State Route 166
 State Route 178
 State Route 184
 State Route 202
 State Route 204
 State Route 223

Public transportation
Arvin Transit is the local municipal bus operator in and around Arvin.
Delano Area Rapid Transit is the local municipal bus operator in Delano.
Golden Empire Transit is the local bus operator in and near Bakersfield.
Kern Transit provides countywide intercity bus service.
Taft Area Transit is the local municipal bus operator in and around Taft.
Kern County is also served by Greyhound and Orange Belt Stages buses and Amtrak trains.

Airports

California City Municipal Airport, California City. (FAA: L71)
Delano Municipal Airport, Delano. (IATA: DLO)
Inyokern Airport, Inyokern. (IATA: IYK)
Kern Valley Airport, Kernville. (FAA: L05)
Lost Hills Airport, Lost Hills. (FAA: L84)
Meadows Field, Bakersfield, an international and general aviation airport. (IATA: BFL)
Mojave Airport, Mojave. (IATA: MHV)
Shafter Airport (Minter Field), Shafter. (IATA: MIT)
Taft Airport, Taft. (FAA: L17)
Tehachapi Municipal Airport, Tehachapi. (IATA: TSP)
Wasco Airport, Wasco. (FAA: L19)

Recreation
Outdoor recreational activities include horseback riding, water skiing (Lake Isabella, Lake Buena Vista, Lake Ming, and private ski ranches). Off-roading and other motorsports take place at Jawbone Canyon, California City, Randsburg, Willow Springs, Buttonwillow, Bakersfield Speedway, Famoso Raceway, and the half-mile Kern Raceway. Hunting, paintball, white-water rafting, kayaking (Kern River), snow skiing (Shirley Meadows and Mount Pinos), shooting ranges (5 Dogs Range), hiking, biking (trails, paths, and roads), camping and fishing are also part of the recreational culture.

Media

Magazines
Bakersfield Life Magazine, Kern County
Bakersfield Magazine, Kern County
Kern County Family Magazine, Kern County

Newspapers
The Bakersfield Californian, Kern County
Mountain Enterprise, southwest Kern mountains area
Mojave Desert News, California City and east Kern desert area
The Daily Independent, Ridgecrest, China Lake, and The Indian Wells Valley
The Kern Valley Sun, Kern Valley area
Kern River Courier, Kern Valley area
Tehachapi News, Tehachapi
Taft Midway Driller, Taft
Taft Independent, Taft
The Delano Record, Delano

TV stations
Kern County is served by stations based in Bakersfield, including:
KBAK-TV (CBS)
KBFX-TV (FOX)
KERO-TV (ABC)
KGET-TV (NBC/CW)

California City, Ridgecrest, and other areas in the Mojave Desert regions of eastern Kern County may instead receive Los Angeles stations.

Communities

Cities

Arvin
Bakersfield (county seat)
California City
Delano
Maricopa
McFarland
Ridgecrest
Shafter
Taft
Tehachapi
Wasco

Census-designated places 

Alta Sierra
Bakersfield Country Club
Bear Valley Springs
Bodfish
Boron
Buttonwillow
Cherokee Strip
China Lake Acres
Derby Acres
Di Giorgio
Dustin Acres
East Bakersfield
Edison
Edmundson Acres
Edwards AFB
El Adobe
Fellows
Ford City
Frazier Park
Fuller Acres
Glennville
Golden Hills
Greenacres
Greenfield
Inyokern
Johannesburg
Keene
Kernville
Lake Isabella
Lake of the Woods
Lamont
Lebec
Lost Hills
McKittrick
Mettler
Mexican Colony
Mojave
Mountain Mesa
North Edwards
Oildale
Old River
Onyx
Pine Mountain Club
Pumpkin Center
Randsburg
Rosamond
Rosedale
Smith Corner
South Taft
Squirrel Mountain Valley
Stallion Springs
Taft Heights
Tupman
Valley Acres
Weedpatch
Weldon
Wofford Heights
Woody

Unincorporated communities

Actis
Aerial Acres
Alameda
Armistead
Bealville
Bena
Caliente
Canebrake
Cantil
Cawelo
Cinco
Claraville
Edwards
Famoso
Goler Heights
Grapevine
Gypsite
Havilah
Indian Wells
Jasmin
Kecks Corner
Keyesville
Loraine
Meridian
Midoil
Millux
Miracle Hot Springs
Missouri Triangle
Monolith
Neufeld
Old Garlock
Old West Ranch
Panama
Pentland
Pinon Pines Estates
Pond
Reward
Ricardo
Rio Bravo
Riverkern
Rowen
Saco
Sageland
Saltdale
Sanborn
Sand Canyon
Semitropic
Shirley Meadows
South Lake
Spicer City
Twin Oaks
Wheeler Ridge
Willow Springs
Wonder Acres

Former places
Adobe Station
Glenburn

Population ranking
The population ranking of the following table is based on the 2020 census of Kern County.

† county seat

Education
School districts include:

Unified:

 El Tejon Unified School District
 Maricopa Unified School District
 McFarland Unified School District
 Mojave Unified School District
 Muroc Joint Unified School District
 Sierra Sands Unified School District
 Southern Kern Unified School District
 Tehachapi Unified School District

Secondary:
 Delano Joint Union High School District
 Kern High School District
 Taft Union High School District
 Wasco Union High School District

Elementary:

 Arvin Union School District
 Bakersfield City School District
 Beardsley Elementary School District
 Belridge Elementary School District
 Blake Elementary School District
 Buttonwillow Union Elementary School District
 Caliente Union Elementary School District
 Delano Union Elementary School District
 Di Giorgio Elementary School District
 Edison Elementary School District
 Elk Hills Elementary School District
 Fairfax Elementary School District
 Fruitvale Elementary School District
 General Shafter Elementary School District
 Greenfield Union School District
 Kernville Union Elementary School District
 Lakeside Union School District
 Lamont Elementary School District
 Linns Valley-Poso Flat Union School District
 Lost Hills Union Elementary School District
 Maple Elementary School District
 McKittrick Elementary School District
 Midway Elementary School District
 Norris Elementary School District
 Panama-Buena Vista School District
 Pond Union Elementary School District
 Richland Union School District
 Rio Bravo-Greeley Union Elementary School District
 Rosedale Union Elementary School District
 Semitropic Elementary School District
 South Fork Union School District
 Standard Elementary School District
 Taft City School District
 Vineland Elementary School District
 Wasco Union Elementary School District

In popular culture
The 2015 Disney film McFarland, USA, starring Kevin Costner, is based on the cross-country team in the city of McFarland, California, which is located in northern Kern County.

See also 

List of museums in the San Joaquin Valley
National Register of Historic Places listings in Kern County, California

Notes

References

Further reading

External links

 
 Keysville Massacre, April 19, 1863—original report from officer in charge

 
1866 establishments in California
California counties
Mojave Desert
Populated places established in 1866
San Joaquin Valley
Majority-minority counties in California